Four Score may refer to:
Old term for 80
Four Score, a cocktail created by Joe Gilmore
The NES Four Score, a four-controller adapter for the NES
"Fourscore", a 1982 piece of music composed by David Dundas, used as the original theme tune to UK television station Channel 4
The first words of Abraham Lincoln's Gettysburg Address
The FOUR Score (Coma Scale) (Full Outline of UnResponsiveness Score), a clinical grading scale for the assessment of level of consciousness